Markus Schopp (born 22 February 1974) is an Austrian football coach and a former midfielder. He was most recently the head coach of Championship club Barnsley.

Club career
Schopp played for Sturm Graz and Red Bull Salzburg in his native Austria. With Sturm Graz, he won the Austrian Bundesliga in 1998–99. He also had stints with Hamburger SV in Germany and alongside Roberto Baggio and Pep Guardiola at Brescia in Italy.

He retired from football in December 2007 due to chronic back problems after a loan spell with the New York Red Bulls of Major League Soccer.

International career
Schopp made his debut for the Austria national team in an August 1995 European Championship qualifying match against Latvia and was a participant at the 1998 FIFA World Cup. He earned 56 caps, scoring 6 goals. His final international was an October 2005 World Cup qualifying match against Northern Ireland.

International goal
Scores and results list Austria's goal tally first.

Managerial career
Schopp began his coaching career in the youth system of Red Bull Salzburg following his retirement.

In April 2013, he was named the interim head coach at his former club Sturm Graz until the end of the season, following the sacking of Peter Hyballa.

In 2018, Schopp became the manager of TSV Hartberg in the Austrian Bundesliga. In the 2019–20 season, Schopp led the club to their highest ever finish in the Austrian Bundesliga and secured a place in the UEFA Europa League for the first time in club history. During the 2020–21 season, he steered the club to a seventh-placed finish. During his time as a manager at Sturm Graz and Hartberg, Schopp built a reputation as a developer of young, emerging talent.

On 29 June 2021, Schopp was appointed head coach of Championship club Barnsley. He signed a three-year deal and replaced Valérien Ismaël, who had left the club a week prior to become the new manager at West Bromwich Albion. On 1 November 2021, Barnsley confirmed the sacking of Schopp after a poor run of form, a run of 13 games without a win and seven straight league defeats.

Career statistics

International

Managerial statistics

Honours

Player
Sturm Graz
Austrian Bundesliga: 1998–99

References

External links
 
 
 

1974 births
Living people
Footballers from Graz
Austrian footballers
Austria international footballers
Association football midfielders
1998 FIFA World Cup players
Austrian Football Bundesliga players
Bundesliga players
Serie A players
Major League Soccer players
SK Sturm Graz players
Hamburger SV players
Brescia Calcio players
FC Red Bull Salzburg players
New York Red Bulls players
Austrian football managers
Austrian Football Bundesliga managers
TSV Hartberg managers
Barnsley F.C. managers
Austrian expatriate footballers
Austrian expatriate football managers
Austrian expatriate sportspeople in Germany
Expatriate footballers in Germany
Austrian expatriate sportspeople in Italy
Expatriate footballers in Italy
Austrian expatriate sportspeople in the United States
Expatriate soccer players in the United States
Austrian expatriate sportspeople in England
Expatriate football managers in England